Ana González González (25 July 1925 – 26 October 2018), more commonly known by her married name Ana González de Recabarren was a Chilean human rights activist.

Biography
She was born in the city of Tocopilla. Ana González was married to Manuel Segundo Recabarren Rojas and they had two children, Luis Emilio  and Manuel Guillermo. Her sons and daughter-in-law Nalvia Rosa Mena Alvarado, at that time pregnant, were arrested and disappeared on 29 April 1976 by the Military dictatorship of Chile, then in its early years. Only her grandson Luis Emilio «Porotito» Recabarren Mena, then 2 years old, returned alive. The next day, on April 30, her husband Manuel (50 years old) went out to look for their children and daughter-in-law, and he was also arrested and disappeared. According to some testimonies, he has been seen alive in the Villa Grimaldi detention center.

After losing a large part of her family, González joined the Association of Relatives of the Disappeared Detainees (AFDD) and became one of its primary leaders alongside Sola Sierra, Viviana Díaz, and Clotario Blest. She participated in a hunger strike at the United Nations Economic Commission for Latin America and the Caribbean headquarters in Santiago. With Gabriela Bravo and Ulda Ortiz, González represented the AFDD at various international organizations such as United Nations, Organization of American States, International Red Cross, International Commission of Jurists, the Holy See, and Amnesty International.

In 1996, she was the focus of the Televisión Nacional de Chile-broadcast documentary Quiero llorar a mares and in 2001 won the Premios Ondas for Ibero-America for the Best Program or Professional or Television Station. In June 2000, she filed a formal complaint against Augusto Pinochet for the disappearance of her family 26 years prior.

At 93 years of age and still not knowing where her family disappeared to, González de Recabarren died on 26 October 2018.

Citations

1925 births
2018 deaths
People from Tocopilla
Chilean people of Spanish descent
Communist Party of Chile politicians
Chilean human rights activists